Spring Scattering Stars is a 1927 painting by American artist Edwin Blashfield. It is an allegory of spring in which a female nude representing spring stands on a wet moon, scattering stars throughout the sky. The painting is catalogued in the Robert Funk Inventory.

Spring Scattering Stars appeared on the Heritage Auctions after being acquired from the estate of Charles Martignette and is now in a private collection.

References

1927 paintings 
20th-century allegorical paintings
Allegorical paintings by American artists
Moon in art 
Nude art